A list of films produced by the Marathi language film industry based in Maharashtra in the year 1949.

1949 Releases
A list of Marathi films released in 1949.

References

External links
Gomolo - 

Lists of 1949 films by country or language
1949
1949 in Indian cinema